Avenue Kléber is an avenue in the 16th arrondissement of Paris, one of the twelve avenues that converge on Place Charles de Gaulle. It was named after Jean Baptiste Kléber, a French general during the French Revolutionary Wars. Before 1879, it was called l'avenue du Roi-de-Rome, in memory of Napoleon II.

It is "lined with grand examples of the ceremonial, yet never austere, buildings favored by Haussmann." Of note are the Icelandic and Peruvian embassies (Number 8 and Number 50, respectively), the Hôtel Raphael at Number 17, and The Peninsula Paris hotel at Number 19.  

French composer Henri Büsser (1872-1973) lived at Number 71. Avenue Kléber was one of the filming locations featured in The Bourne Identity.

References

Kleber